Georgy Semyonovich Shpagin (17 April 1897 – 6 February 1952) was a Russian weapons designer. He is best known as the creator of the famous PPSh-41 submachine gun, as well as working with Vasily Degtyaryov on the DShK heavy machine gun.

Early life 
Shpagin was born in 1897 to a peasant family in Klyushnikovo close to Kovrovo, in what was then the Russian Empire. He attended school for three years, before becoming a carpenter at the age of 12 (in 1909). He was drafted into the Russian Army in 1916 to fight on the Eastern Front. He was assigned to repair artillery the following year.

Russian Revolution 
After the October Revolution, he became a member of the Red Army, and worked as a gunsmith in Vladimir Oblast. After 1920, he worked in a workshop designing weapons in the same area, working with Vladimir Grigoryevich Fyodorov and Vasily Degtyaryov.

Creations 
After a decade and a half of unsuccessful attempts, in 1938 his workshop released the DShK heavy machine gun. It is still in widespread use as an anti-personnel gun, an anti-aircraft gun, and a light anti-tank weapon. About 8,000 of them were made during the Second World War. In 1940, he came up with his most accredited design, the PPSh-41 sub-machine gun, which was the staple automatic weapon of the Red Army during the Second World War. It was cheap to produce and easy to maintain. He joined the Communist Party of the Soviet Union in 1944. He, in competition with the AS-44, also created his own prototype assault rifle called the ASh-44 which was blowback operated. It was dropped from the trial due to being uncontrollable on full auto and lead to the mandate that all future rifles be locked breech.

Post-war 
Shpagin was a member of the Supreme Soviet of the USSR from 1946 to 1950. He became seriously ill with stomach cancer, and died of it in early 1952.

Honours and awards 
Shpagin was awarded the Stalin Prize, 2nd class, in 1941 and the title of Hero of Socialist Labour on 16 September 1945, for "creation of new types of weapons and raising the combat power of the Red Army". He received three Orders of Lenin during the war, in 1941, 1943 and 1945, in addition to the Order of Suvorov, 2nd class, in 1945 and the Order of the Red Star in 1938.

Posthumous recognition 
A street in Vyatka is named after him. In both Kovrov and Vyatka there are large public monuments to him.

References 
 Biography from warheroes.ru

1897 births
1952 deaths
People from Vladimir Oblast
Burials at Novodevichy Cemetery
Firearm designers
Heroes of Socialist Labour
Stalin Prize winners
Recipients of the Order of Lenin
Recipients of the Order of Suvorov, 2nd class
Soviet engineers
20th-century Russian engineers
Russian inventors
Soviet inventors